Chorley is a surname. Notable people with the surname include:

Ben Chorley (born 1982), English football player
Charles Chorley (c. 1810 – 1874), journalist and man of letters
Henry Fothergill Chorley (1808–1872), English music critic
John Rutter Chorley (1806–1867), English scholar of Spanish literature
Richard Chorley (1927–2002), English geographer
Baron Chorley, peer of the United Kingdom

English toponymic surnames